Joseph A. Meyer (December 10, 1893 – July 14, 1970) was an American football, basketball, and baseball coach.  He served as the head football coach at Xavier University from 1920 to 1935 and at the University of Cincinnati from 1938 to 1942.  Meyer was also the head basketball coach at Xavier from 1920 to 1933, tallying a mark of 94–52.  In addition, he was the head baseball coach at Xavier in 1926 and at Cincinnati in 1942, amassing a career college baseball record of 14–10.  Meyer played basketball and baseball at the University of Notre Dame.  He died at the age of 75 on July 14, 1970 at his home in Cincinnati, Ohio.

Head coaching record

Football

Baseball

Notes

References

External links
 
 

Place of birth missing
1893 births
1970 deaths
American men's basketball coaches
American men's basketball players
Baseball first basemen
Cincinnati Bearcats baseball coaches
Cincinnati Bearcats football coaches
Columbia Comers players
College men's basketball head coaches in the United States
Notre Dame Fighting Irish baseball players
Notre Dame Fighting Irish men's basketball players
Xavier Musketeers athletic directors
Xavier Musketeers baseball coaches
Xavier Musketeers football coaches
Xavier Musketeers men's basketball coaches
United States Navy personnel of World War I
United States Navy officers
Baseball players from Cincinnati
Basketball coaches from Ohio
Basketball players from Cincinnati